Ebanilson "Eba" Domingos de Lima Viegas (born 7 October 1999) is a footballer who plays as a forward for Fabril. Born in Portugal, he represents the São Tomé and Príncipe national team.

International career
Viegas made his professional debut with the São Tomé and Príncipe national team in a 2–0 2021 Africa Cup of Nations qualification loss to Sudan on 24 March 2021.

References

External links
 
 
 

1999 births
Living people
Sportspeople from Cascais
People with acquired São Tomé and Príncipe citizenship
São Tomé and Príncipe footballers
São Tomé and Príncipe international footballers
Portuguese footballers
Portuguese people of São Tomé and Príncipe descent
Association football forwards
Campeonato de Portugal (league) players
AD Oeiras players